The India–Africa Forum Summit (IAFS) is the official platform for the African-Indian relations. IAFS will be held once in every three years. It was first held from April 4 to April 8, 2008 in New Delhi, India. It was the first such meeting between the heads of state and government of India and 14 countries of Africa chosen by the African Union. Libya and Egypt's heads of state did not attend.

Agenda 
Rising oil and food prices were the top concerns for the African and Indian leaders during the summit.
India has pledged to support at the level of health and education related projects in Africa

Topics 

 agricultural sector
 trade
 industry and investment
 peace and security
 promotion of good governance and civil society
 information and communication technology

African representation 

 Chairperson of the African Union (AU)
 Chairperson of the AU Commission
 Chairpersons of the eight recognised Regional Economic Communities (REC's)
 Chairpersons of the New Partnership for Africa's Development (NEPAD)
 Heads of State and Government Implementation Committee (HSIGC) 
 the five African NEPAD initiating countries

2008 First India–Africa Forum Summit - New Delhi, India 
The first such summit was held from April 4 to April 8, 2008 in New Delhi, India. It was the first such meeting between the heads of state and government of India and 14 countries of Africa chosen by the African Union. Libya and Egypt's heads of state did not attend.

2011 Second India–Africa Forum Summit - Addis Ababa, Ethiopia
The second summit was held at the Ethiopian capital Addis Ababa, with India and 15 African Countries participating. The leaders discussed significant aspects of the India-Africa partnership with the objective of enhancing and widening its ambit for mutual benefit.

2015 Third India–Africa Forum Summit - New Delhi 

The third summit in a rotation basis is held in New Delhi, India from 26 to 30 October 2015. The 5 day summit started with consultations on official level followed by the Head of States/governments level summit on 29 October 2015 with scheduled bilateral meetings on 30 October 2015. This was Modi government's biggest diplomatic outreach involving delegates from a large number of African nations.

Earlier the summit in a rotation basis was scheduled to be held in New Delhi, India in December 2014. But lately Syed Akbaruddin, the official spokesperson of Indian Foreign Ministry told the media that the scheduled summit postponed to 2015 and will include more no. of African leaders unlike previous two occasion where the event was restricted to only 10-15 African countries. In the largest-ever turnout of African leaders in India, at least 41 leaders-including South African president Jacob Zuma, Egyptian president Abdel Fattah el-Sisi, Zimbabwe president Robert Mugabe and Nigerian President Muhammadu Buhari confirmed their presence in New Delhi for the India-Africa forum summit in October 2015.

See also 
 Africa-India relations
 Bandung Conference, the first large-scale Asian–African Conference in 1955
 Forum on China-Africa Cooperation
 United States–Africa Leaders Summit

References

External links

 "First India-Africa summit pledges close partnership"
 "Gaddafi, Mubarak to skip India-Africa summit"
 Africa–India Forum Summit
 "External affairs ministry of India

Politics of Africa
2008 in India
2008 in Africa
Forum Summit, Africa-India
Recurring events established in 2008